A religious ground motive (RGM) is a concept in the reformational philosophy of Herman Dooyeweerd. In his book Roots of Western Culture Dooyeweerd identified four great frameworks or value-systems that have determined human interpretations of reality with formative power over Western culture. Three of these are dualistic and may be described in the terms of Hegelian dialectic as antitheses of opposite poles of reference that are eventually resolved by synthesis, only for the synthesis to draw out, inexorably, a new opposing pole and so a new antithesis.

Other RGMs may readily be added to Dooyeweerd's list, and this endeavour may be sanctioned by Dooyeweerd's own passing reference to a Zoroastrian RGM.

The Form/Matter RGM of the Greeks 

The Form/Matter framework for ontology was articulated by Greek philosophers, particularly Aristotle. However, Dooyeweerd identifies its roots in the ancient religious beliefs about a river of life and the rule of μοιρα fate, which came to be set against the later culture religion of the rule of the Olympian gods, in a logical antithesis. Nietzsche argues, similarly, that Greek philosophy from the time of Homer through to Plato and Aristotle demonstrates a tension between valorization of a Dionysian natural orgiastic devotion to the life force, celebrated in the annual Baccanal at Delphi, and the model of the city and its justice as achieved by calm thought in accord with an Apollonian devotion represented by the Temple of Athena.  Perhaps the best articulation of this tension of values can be seen in the tragic drama where the Furies are constrained and given a place below the Temple's altar where they can no longer unleash themselves in the historic form of a blood revenge.

The Creation - Fall - Redemption RGM 

Dooyeweerd's next RGM is not dualistic but ternary, described as Creation - Fall - Redemption: three moments of radical cosmic change.  This RGM is argued to be authentically Judeo-Christian because it does not identify any parts or aspects of experienced reality that might be absolutised in place of God; rather, it shows the significance of the biblical metanarrative for a correct understanding of reality.  Significantly, it is an understanding that can only be derived from special revelation.  For much of the history of Christianity this RGM has not taken its legitimate prominence because of the way that Christianity was accommodated to Greek pagan philosophy in the writings of some of the Church Fathers such as Justin and Athenagoras.  This facilitated a transition from the Form/Matter RGM to the Nature/Grace RGM.  Dooyeweerd believed that the Protestant Reformation represented a re-discovery of the Creation - Fall - Redemption RGM and that he, with others such as Abraham Kuyper, was helping to restore it to its rightful place in Christian thinking,  as the foundation for a Protestant Christian worldview and Christian philosophy.

The Nature/Grace RGM of the Latin Middle Ages 

According to Dooyeweerd, the authentic Creation - Fall - Redemption RGM of the New Testament writers largely failed to win its place in the development of Christian philosophy.  Instead, a synthesis of the Form/Matter RGM took place, giving rise to a concept of natural earthly reality, and the  Christian theological understanding of redemption was taken as the antithesis to this in the form of the concept of Grace. Thus arose the Nature/Grace antithesis, which was initially oriented with Grace as superior to Nature.  The Nature/Grace RGM was powerfully developed in the philosophy of Thomas Aquinas and so persisted through the Renaissance of the 12th century, the Renaissance, and indeed through the Protestant Reformation and Catholic Counter-Reformation.

The Nature/Freedom RGM of the Enlightenment 

Eventually, with the decline in the Church's political dominance and the implicit dismissal of the earthly realm by the polarisation of the Nature/Grace RGM, this antithesis was secularised, leading to its replacement by a humanistic Nature/Freedom RGM.  This may be understood by considering how Enlightenment thought may be aligned with each of two poles.  One was the elevation of Nature, the deterministic universe of the natural philosophers; the other was the quest for absolute freedom, the ideal of Romanticism.  Dooyeweerd saw how many modernist philosophers struggled to account for both sides of this dualistic RGM, retaining human freedom while construing the Universe as a kind of machine, but without finding a lasting solution.

The Nature/Grace RGM is the last in Dooyeweerd's survey, but he then moves on, in the final section of Roots of Western Culture, to a critique of Historicism.  This worldview, abandoning absolutes and proposing a relativistic interpretation of culture, appears as an elevation of the Freedom motif above the Nature motif, and is in turn contested by the rise of modern sociology with its implicit bid for dominance on behalf of Nature.  This brings the survey up to Dooyeweerd's time of writing, where he is ready to propose his new framework for Reformational philosophy founded on the Creation - Fall - Redemption RGM.

References 

Herman Dooyeweerd, A New Critique of Theoretical Thought

Herman Dooyeweerd, In the Twilight of Western Thought

Philosophical schools and traditions